Amber "AB" Stocks is an American basketball executive consultant, coach, and former player. She was most notably the General Manager and Head Coach of the Chicago Sky in the Women's National Basketball Association (WNBA). Stocks was as an assistant coach for two years with the Los Angeles Sparks, including the 2016 WNBA Championship, after coaching for many years in the college and amateur ranks. Stocks played collegiate basketball for the University of Cincinnati, then earned a Master of Education from Xavier University and a Juris Doctor from the University of Dayton. In 2018, she transitioned to full-time strategic consulting. Stocks is an active analyst, speaker, and contributor to the applied sciences of sports.

Coaching record

|-
| align="left" | CHI
| align="left" |2017
|34||12||22|||| align="center" |5th in East||—||—||—||—
| align="center" |Missed Playoffs
|-
| align="left" | CHI
| align="left" |2018
|34||13||21|||| align="center" |4th in East||—||—||—||—
| align="center" |Missed Playoffs
|-class="sortbottom"
| align="left" |Career
| ||68||25||43|||| ||0||0||0||

References

Year of birth missing (living people)
Living people
African-American basketball coaches
African-American basketball players
Basketball coaches from Ohio
Basketball players from Ohio
Cincinnati Bearcats women's basketball players
Chicago Sky coaches
Los Angeles Sparks coaches
Xavier Musketeers women's basketball coaches
Small forwards
21st-century African-American people
21st-century African-American women
Women's National Basketball Association general managers